1968 U.S. Open may refer to:
1968 U.S. Open (golf), a major golf tournament
1968 US Open (tennis), a Grand Slam tennis tournament